Speeding refers to exceeding the speed limit

Speedin'  may refer to:
"Speedin'", song by The Medallions 1955
Speedin', song by Rick Ross 2007
Speedin' (Omarion song)